Jan Grue (born 28 March 1981) is a Norwegian writer, academic and actor.

Career
Born in Oslo on 28 March 1981, Grue graduated with a doctorate degree in linguistics in 2011. He was assigned with the University of Oslo from 2012, and a professor from 2016. 

Grue has written books in several genres. His books include the short story collection Alt under kontroll from 2010, followed by Ubestemt tid (2011) and Kropp og sinn (2012). Further books are the short story collection Normalia (2015), the novel Det blir ikke bedre (2016), Bortenfor, bortenfor, bortenfor (2017), and the short story collection Uromomenter (2019). He has written the children's books Oliver from 2011, Skadedyr (2015), and Super-Magnus (2016). 

He was awarded the Norwegian Critics Prize for Literature for best non-fiction in 2018, for his book Jeg lever et liv som ligner deres. The book was also nominated for the Nordic Council's Literature Prize.

In 2019 Grue appeared in the Norwegian political thriller series Occupied.

References

1981 births
Living people
People from Oslo
Academic staff of the University of Oslo
Norwegian novelists
Norwegian children's writers
Norwegian non-fiction writers